Ohno Dam  is a gravity dam located in Hokkaido Prefecture in Japan. The dam is used for irrigation and water supply. The catchment area of the dam is 5.4 km2. The dam impounds about 12  ha of land when full and can store 1600 thousand cubic meters of water. The construction of the dam was started on 1990 and completed in 2002.

References

Dams in Hokkaido